Kiko is a given name. It is also used as a nickname for Francisco, for Enrique and for Federico. Notable people with the name include:

 Princess Akishino or Kiko (born 1966), a member of the Japanese imperial family 
 Kiko (footballer, born 1972), full name  Francisco Miguel Narváez Machón, Spanish retired footballer
 Kiko (footballer, born 1978), full name Josualdo Alves da Silva Oliveira, Brazilian footballer
 Kiko (footballer, born 1988), full name Francisco José Olivas, Spanish footballer
 Kiko (footballer, born 1993), full name Francisco Manuel Geraldo Rosa, Portuguese footballer
 Kiko (footballer, born 1998), full name Francisco Pomares Ortega, Andorran footballer
 Kiko Argüello (born 1939), one of the initiators of the Catholic group Neocatechumenal Way
 Kiko Calero (born 1975), Major League Baseball relief pitcher
 Kiko Casilla (born 1986), Spanish football goalkeeper
 Francisco Femenía (born 1991), Spanish footballer
 Kiko Garcia (born 1953), former Major League Baseball infielder
 Prince Christoph of Hohenlohe-Langenburg (1956-2006), European socialite
 Kiko Loureiro (born 1972), Brazilian heavy metal guitarist
 Federico Macheda (born 1991), Italian footballer
 Kiko Martínez (born 1984), Spanish boxer
 Khaled Mouelhi (born 1981), Tunisian footballer
 Francis Magalona (1964-2009), Filipino rapper sometimes known as "Kiko"
 Francis "Kiko" Pangilinan (born 1963), Filipino senator
 Kiko Amat (born 1971), Spanish writer
 Kiko Ratón (born 1976), Spanish footballer
 Kiko Sánchez (born 1965), Spanish sailor and 1992 Olympic gold medalist
 Kiko Torres (born 1975), Spanish retired footballer
 Kheireddine Zarabi (born 1984), Algerian footballer
 Kiko Mizuhara (born 1990), American/Japanese actress and model
 Kiko Alonso (born 1990), American football linebacker
 Kiko Yokota (born 1997), Japanese rhythmic gymnast
Kiko Merley (born 1997), American music producer and member of Brockhampton
 Lolo Kiko, a nickname given by Filipinos to Pope Francis during his visit to the Philippines in 2015

Fictional characters 

 Kiko, the fictional host of the Gorgeous Tiny Chicken Machine Show
 Kiko, a character in the film The Son of Kong
 Kiko, a character played by Carlos Villagrán in the Mexican TV series Chavo del Ocho and Ah, qué Kiko!
 Kiko the Kangaroo, a character in a number of Terrytoons cartoons during 1936 and 1937
 Kiko, a rabbit that belonged to Bloom in Winx Club.
 Kiko, a character in the film Turistas, played by Agles Steib
 Kiko, a villain in the James Bond video game 007: Nightfire
 Kiiko Sasaki, a character in the anime series Laughing Under The Clouds
 Kiko Matsing, a monkey muppet character in Philippine Children's show Batibot

See also
 Kiko (disambiguation)

Brazilian given names
Japanese feminine given names
Lists of people by nickname
Spanish-language hypocorisms